Storhamar Hockey, often referred to by its initials SIL, is a Norwegian ice hockey team based in Hamar, Norway. The club currently plays in the Fjordkraft-ligaen, the highest level of Norwegian hockey. The club has won seven regular season titles and seven national championships since its founding on 18 March 1957. Storhamar play their home games in the CC Amfi. The club also includes the largest junior department in Norwegian ice hockey. The team colours are yellow and blue.

History
The 1952 Winter Olympics inspired local Hamar youth to form a hockey club in the area. The first ice rink was constructed in 1955, and Storhamar was formally accepted into the Norwegian Ice Hockey Association two years later.

To date, the club has won the Norwegian Championships (playoffs) seven times, 1995, 1996, 1997, 2000, 2004, 2008 and 2018.

The most notable player in franchise history is Erik Kristiansen who played 20 seasons scoring 509 goals and 406 assists in 649 games. The best known  player internationally from Storhamar is Patrick Thoresen.

During the 2016–17 playoffs, Storhamar Hockey was involved in the longest professional hockey match ever recorded, taking 217 minutes and 14 seconds to defeat Sparta Warriors 2-1. The game ended in the 11th period when Joakim Jensen scored for Storhamar.

Season-by-season results
This is a partial list of the last five seasons completed by Storhamar. For the full season-by-season history, see List of Storhamar Dragons seasons.
{| class="wikitable"
|bgcolor="#D0E7FF"|<small>Norwegian Champions</small>
|bgcolor="#FFE6BD"|Regular Season Champions
|bgcolor="#ddffdd"|Promoted
|bgcolor="#FFCCCC"|Relegated
|}

Players
Team captains
 Michael Smithurst - 2000-03
 Mikael Tjälldèn - 2003-05
 Mads Hansen - 2005-06
 Mattias Livf - 2006-08
 Pål Johnsen - 2008-13
 Mads Hansen - 2013-15 
 Christian Larrivée - 2015-17
 Patrick Thoresen - 2017
 Kodie Curran - 2017-18
 Patrick Thoresen - 2018-

 Retired numbers 

Head coaches
Lasse Beckman
Lenny Eriksson
Lennart Åhlberg
Göran Sjöberg
Petter Thoresen
Lars Molin
Petter Salsten
Aleksandr Smirnov
Rune Gulliksen
Peter Johansson

 Records and statistics 

Statistics for regular season only.
  – current active player

 Scoring leaders 

 Most league matches 

Last updated: 19 January 2021Source: silarkivet.no

TeamNorwegian Championship1994–95
1995–96
1996–97
1999–00
2003-04
2007-08
2017-18

IndividualNIHF Golden Puck winners Øyvind Løsamoen - 1983/84
 Erik Kristiansen - 1984/85
 Ole Eskild Dahlstrøm - 1995/96
 Petter Salsten - 1996/97
 Pål Johnsen - 1999/00GET-ligaen Playoff MVP 2006/07, 2014/15 - Christian Larrivée
 2007/08 - Ruben SmithAll Star team selections'''
 Åge Ellingsen, 1985, 1986, 1989
 Erik Kristiansen, 1985
 Petter Salsten, 1993, 1995, 1996, 1997, 1998
 Nikolai Davydkin, 1993
 Jim Marthinsen, 1995, 1996
 Martin Åhlberg, 1995
 Ole Eskild Dahlstrøm, 1996, 1997, 2002, 2003
 Tom Erik Olsen, 1996
 Aleksandr Smirnov, 1997
 Mika Rautio, 1998
 Pål Johnsen, 2000
 Antti Rahkonen, 2004
 Jonas Norgren, 2006
 Mads Hansen, 2006
 Patrick Yetman, 2006
 Trevor Koenig, 2011
 Tommy Johansen, 2012

Previous seasons' rosters
Storhamar Dragons roster 2009/10

References

External links
Official website

 
Ice hockey teams in Norway
Ice hockey clubs established in 1957
Sport in Hamar
1957 establishments in Norway
GET-ligaen teams